Katowice Voivodeship can refer to one of two political entities in Poland:

Katowice Voivodeship (1), initially "Silesian-Dabrowa Voivodeship", was a unit of administrative division and local government in the years 1946–1975. It was superseded by Katowice Voivodeship (2), Częstochowa Voivodeship, Bielsko-Biała Voivodeship, and Opole Voivodeship. Its capital city was Katowice.

Katowice Voivodeship (2) was a unit of administrative division and local government in Poland in the years 1975–1998, superseded by the Silesian Voivodeship. Its capital city was Katowice.

Major cities and towns: (population in 1995) 
 Katowice (354,200);
 Sosnowiec (249,000);
 Bytom (227,600);
 Gliwice (214,000);
 Zabrze (201,600);
 Ruda Śląska (166,300);
 Rybnik (144,300);
 Tychy (133,900);
 Dąbrowa Górnicza (130,900);
 Chorzów (125,800);
 Jastrzębie Zdrój (103,500);
 Jaworzno (98,500);
 Mysłowice (80,000);
 Siemianowice Śląskie (78,100);
 Wodzisław Śląski (68,600);
 Tarnowskie Góry (67,200);
 Piekary Śląskie (67,200);
 Żory (66,300);
 Racibórz (65,100);
 Będzin (63,100);
 Świętochłowice (59,600);
 Zawiercie (56,300);
 Knurów (44,200);
 Chrzanów (42,100);
 Olkusz (40,500);
 Mikołów (38,900);
 Czeladź (36,600);
 Czechowice-Dziedzice (35,600);
 Pszczyna (34,600);
 Czerwionka-Leszczyny (30,100);
 Rydułtowy (24,100);
 Łaziska Górne (23,000);
 Bieruń (22,100);
 Pyskowice (21,900);
 Trzebinia (20,000);
 Brzeszcze (12,441).

See also
 Voivodeships of Poland

Former voivodeships of Poland (1945–1975)
Former voivodeships of Poland (1975–1998)
History of Lesser Poland Voivodeship
History of Silesian Voivodeship
History of Katowice